Loramie Creek is a  tributary of the Great Miami River in western Ohio in the United States. According to the Geographic Names Information System, the stream has also been known historically as "Laramie Creek," "Loramie Ditch," "Loramies Creek," and "Lonamie Creek." It is named after Louis Lorimier, a French-Canadian fur trader who had a trading post in the area in the 18th century.

Loramie Creek rises in northern Shelby County and initially flows southwestwardly, passing through a dam which causes the creek to form Lake Loramie, along which a state park is located. Near Fort Loramie the creek turns southeastwardly, flowing through Lockington Dam (a dry dam) and past the community of Lockington.

A USGS stream gauge on the creek at Lockington recorded a mean annual discharge of  during water years 1921–2019.

See also
Loramie Creek AVA
List of rivers of Ohio

References

Columbia Gazetteer of North America entry

External links
Lake Loramie State Park website
Loramie Valley Alliance watershed project

Rivers of Ohio
Rivers of Miami County, Ohio
Rivers of Shelby County, Ohio